Wohlfahrtia balassogloi is a species of flesh fly in the family Sarcophagidae.

Range
Russia.

References

Sarcophagidae
Insects described in 1881
Taxa named by Josef Aloizievitsch Portschinsky